Antonio de Miguel may refer to:

 Antonio de Miguel (footballer, born 1896) (1896–1936), Spanish football forward
 Antonio de Miguel (footballer, born 1899) (1899–unknown), Argentine football forward